Moto C is a smartphone developed by Motorola Mobility, a subsidiary of Lenovo. It is a low-end device developed primarily for the emerging markets. It was released on May 1, 2017.

The focus of these handsets is on offering reasonable specifications at a low price. This is an attempt to counter the advance of manufacturers that offer low cost smartphones.

Specifications

Moto C 
Dimensions: 145.5 x 73.6 x 9 mm
Weight: 154g
Color options: Metallic Cherry, Pearl White, Fine Gold, and Starry Black
Battery: 2,350 mAh (removable)
 SoC: MediaTek MT6737M
CPU: 1.1 GHz quad-core ARM Cortex-A53 64-bit processor
 GPU: ARM Mali T720-MP1
Operating system: Android 7.0 Nougat
 Screen: 5 inch display with 854 x 480 resolution
 Memory: 1 GB RAM, 
Storage: 8GB or 16 GB internal storage expandable up to 32GB. 
 Rear camera: 5 MP rear camera with 1.4 micron (μm) pixels, 74-degree field of view, fixed focus, an LED flash, and 720p video recording support
Front camera: 2 MP front camera with 1 micron (μm) pixels, 63-degree field of view, fixed focus and an LED flash

Moto C Plus 

 Dimensions: 144 x 72.3 x 10 mm
Weight: 162g
Color options: Metallic Cherry, Pearl White, Fine Gold, and Starry Black
Battery: 4,000 mAh (removable)
 SoC: MediaTek MT6737
Processor: 1.3 GHz quad-core ARM Cortex-A53 64-bit processor
 GPU: ARM Mali T720-MP2
Operating system: Android 7.0 Nougat
 Screen: 5 inch HD display with 1280 x 720 resolution
 Memory: 1 GB or 2 GB RAM
Storage: 16 GB internal storage expandable up to 32GB
 Rear camera: 8 MP rear camera with f/2.2 aperture, 1.12 micron pixels, autofocus, 71-degree field of view and an LED flash
Front camera: 2 MP front camera
 Dual SIM

See also
 Comparison of smartphones
 Moto E4

References

Android (operating system) devices
Motorola mobile phones
Mobile phones introduced in 2017
Mobile phones with user-replaceable battery